Harald Fereberger (30 May 1929 – 15 July 2019) was an Austrian sailor. He competed at the 1952 Summer Olympics, the 1960 Summer Olympics and the 1972 Summer Olympics.

References

External links
 

1929 births
2019 deaths
Austrian male sailors (sport)
Olympic sailors of Austria
Sailors at the 1952 Summer Olympics – Star
Sailors at the 1960 Summer Olympics – Flying Dutchman
Sailors at the 1972 Summer Olympics – Dragon
People from Gmunden
Sportspeople from Upper Austria